The Arkansas–LSU football rivalry, formally known as the Battle for the Boot but more recently sometimes informally called the Battle for the Golden Boot, is an American college football rivalry between the Razorbacks of the University of Arkansas and Tigers of Louisiana State University. The first game between the Razorbacks and Tigers was played in 1901. With the admission of Arkansas as a member of the Southeastern Conference (SEC) in 1992, the rivalry became an annual game between these members of the SEC Western Division. "The Boot" trophy was first awarded to the game's winner in 1996.

The game was usually played on the Friday after Thanksgiving, but this changed in the 2014 season when Texas A&M was scheduled to play LSU on Thanksgiving. Arkansas is now scheduled to play Missouri during the Thanksgiving holiday weekend.

History

Pre-Boot era
Arkansas and LSU began playing each other in 1901, with LSU claiming a 15–0 victory in Baton Rouge, Louisiana. Between 1906 and 1936 (with the exception of 1918, when LSU did not field a team due to World War I) and again 1953 and 1956, the two teams played each other during regular seasons on a yearly basis. With the annual LSU–Tulane game being suspended at times during the first decade of the twentieth century, the Arkansas–LSU series occasionally moved into its season finale slot (foreshadowing what would again happen starting in 1992). From 1913 to 1936, the two teams also played each other in the State Fair Classic, until Arkansas canceled its future appearances after dropping seven straight contests to LSU. After the 1914 season, Arkansas and LSU were invited to join the new Southwest Conference, but LSU declined. In 1924, the two schools became the first future SEC rivals to play for a trophy, as part of the dedication of Shreveport's new State Fair Stadium. In 1935, LSU purchased Sheik, its first live royal bengal tiger from the Little Rock Zoo and formally installed him as Mike I at the State Fair Classic against Arkansas the next year. In addition, the two teams played each other at the end of the regular season in the Cotton Bowl Classic twice, on New Year's Day of 1947 and 1966.

In 1992, LSU and Arkansas resumed their annual rivalry when Arkansas joined the Southeastern Conference after leaving the SWC. The teams played each other four times in the conference before the introduction of The Boot trophy in 1996. The Razorbacks won 30-6 in 1992—their first win in the series since 1929—and 42-24 in 1993, while the Tigers prevailed 30-12 in 1994 and 28-0 in 1995.

The Boot era

LSU leads the trophy series 18–9, through the 2022 season. Since 1996, the winning team has received the 200-pound, $10,000 "Boot" trophy. The trophy itself stands a little over four feet tall, is molded out of 24-karat gold, and resembles the outline of the states of Arkansas and Louisiana connected, thus making a boot shape. The Boot was created by former Razorback linebacker David Bazzel. According to Bazzel, it was intentionally made "as big and gaudy as possible, because I wanted to create value in it with gold and size," also making it the heaviest true trophy in college football (the Fremont Cannon, while not an actual trophy, is also exchanged at an annual game and weighs more than The Boot trophy—as did the old Chief Caddo statue before its rivalry game was discontinued). The series has generally represented an important battle in the SEC Western Division, with either Arkansas or LSU representing the division in the SEC Football Championship Game in many seasons. In 1992 and from 1996 to 2008 and again from 2011 to 2013, the game was played on Black Friday.

After the 1992 Fayetteville, Arkansas game that marked the revival of the series, it was then played on alternating years in Little Rock, Arkansas at War Memorial Stadium, which is the secondary home stadium for the Razorbacks, and in Baton Rouge, Louisiana at Tiger Stadium. Starting in 2012, Arkansas home games were played on campus in Fayetteville.

LSU won the inaugural trophy meeting in 1996, 17–7, and for six years the trophy changed hands every meeting, beginning with Arkansas winning in 1998. After Arkansas' "Miracle on Markham" victory in 2002, LSU won The Boot four straight times, from 2003 to 2006.

The trophy returned to Arkansas' possession on November 23, 2007, when the Razorbacks beat then top-ranked LSU 50–48 in three overtimes in Baton Rouge. The victory was the first for former Razorback coach Houston Nutt in five tries in Tiger Stadium. Any talk about the win serving as long-overdue revenge for costing Arkansas the 1965 national championship was short-lived, however, as LSU still managed to qualify for and win the 2008 BCS National Championship Game. Arkansas successfully defended The Boot in 2008 with a spectacular come-from-behind victory in the last minute of the game. However, in 2009, LSU recaptured the trophy with a field goal by Josh Jasper in overtime. The 2010 matchup was played on November 27 in Little Rock, and Arkansas won 31–23, led by head coach Bobby Petrino. Top-ranked LSU overcame an early 14-point deficit to reclaim the trophy in 2011, 41–17.

Beginning with the 2014 season, the Battle for the Boot was no longer played on the final weekend of the regular season. LSU now faces Texas A&M, while Arkansas now has an annual meeting with Missouri. Missouri was designated as Arkansas' permanent cross-division opponent from the East, replacing South Carolina, which came into the SEC with Arkansas in 1992.

Game results

Notable games

1901 – first meeting 
LSU 15 – Arkansas 0

In the initial meeting between the two teams during the 1901 season, LSU came away with the victory, shutting out Arkansas. The game was played in Baton Rouge, Louisiana, and was one of the first games ever played by either school's football team.

1947 – the "Ice Bowl" 

LSU 0 – Arkansas 0

The 1947 Cotton Bowl Classic was played at the end of the 1946 college football season.  It was the first matchup between the rivals since the 1936 State Fair Classic. The game was named the "Ice Bowl" due to the ice, sleet, snow, rain, and sub-20 degree (Fahrenheit) weather which produced horrid playing conditions. The Tigers only accepted the invitation after being snubbed of a bid to the Sugar Bowl, and entered the game with a record of 9–1.

Despite the scoreless tie, the game was still considered an accomplishment due to the tickets selling out weeks in advance and the attendance of the game, which was around 38,000 despite the weather. LSU had the upper-hand most of the game in terms of offensive production, holding a 15-1 edge over the Razorbacks in first downs and a 271-54 advantage in total yardage, led by quarterback Y. A. Tittle. The Arkansas defense kept the Tiger offense out of the end zone from the Arkansas 1, 6, 7, and 8 yard lines, but Arkansas could not capitalize on any of the stops. The final two plays proved the cold did not stop the teams from having a flair for the dramatic, as Razorback Clyde Scott (a future College Football Hall of Famer) tackled LSU receiver Jeff Odom at the Razorback one, preserving the tie. The Tigers then attempted the go-ahead field goal, but a bad snap ended the game on the final play. This game marked the second (and last) time the two teams tied.

1966 – Cotton Bowl Classic with national championship implications 

LSU 14 – Arkansas 7

The two teams played each other on January 1, 1966, in the Cotton Bowl Classic to end the 1965 season. Arkansas had won the national championship in the previous year (1964), and came into the game with a 10–0 record (and an overall 22-game winning streak on the line) after winning the 1965 SWC title.  The Razorbacks were again looking to win the national championship, and had the number one scoring offense coming into the game, averaging 32.4 points per contest.

Arkansas took the ball to the end zone on the opening drive, capped by a 19-yard toss from Jon Brittenum to All-American end Bobby Crockett. Running back Joe LaBruzzo then ran in from three yards out for the Bengal Tigers to tie the game at 7. Razorback QB Brittenum then left the game after suffering a shoulder injury and the Hogs fumbled the ball three plays later. LaBruzzo again scored, this time from one yard away, giving the Tigers a 14–7 halftime lead.

Neither team scored in the second half, and Arkansas ended the game on the LSU 24 yard line. Razorback Bobby Crockett set a bowl record with 10 catches for 129 yards, but it was not enough as the Tigers edged Arkansas for the win, 14–7.  The Tigers improved their final record to 8–3, while the Razorbacks dropped to 10–1 for the season.

1992 – Arkansas joins the SEC 

1992 was the first year that Arkansas played a football season as a part of the Southeastern Conference (after previously playing in the now defunct Southwest Conference). Arkansas joined the SEC in 1991, along with the South Carolina Gamecocks, to bring the league up to 12 teams, allowing the conference to stage the SEC Championship Game on a yearly basis between the winner of the Western Division and the Eastern division. The Razorbacks won the initial SEC contest between the teams, 30–6, the only time until 2012 the game was played in Fayetteville. The Boot trophy was not awarded in the annual contest between the teams until 1996.

1996 – first "Boot" trophy awarded 
LSU 17 – Arkansas 7

In 1996, the 19th-ranked LSU Tigers won the first "Boot" trophy, 17–7. For the Tigers, running back Kevin Faulk rushed for 138 yards and a touchdown and quarterback Herb Tyler threw for 191 yards. LSU coach Gerry DiNardo was quoted after the game as saying, "Obviously it was a great win. I feel we had a terrific first half. In the second half the defense didn't play as well as it should and the offense didn't score."

Initial reaction to the awarding of the trophy was mixed, but in the intervening years it has come to represent a ratcheting up of the rivalry.

2002 – "Miracle on Markham" 

Arkansas 21 – LSU 20

The 2002 contest between the two teams is now referred to as the "Miracle on Markham" by most Arkansas fans and those in the media. (Markham Street is the main street that runs by War Memorial Stadium in Little Rock where the game was played.)

Trailing 20–14 with 34 seconds left, the Razorbacks (8–3, 4–3 SEC) got the ball at their own 19. Arkansas quarterback Matt Jones completed a 50-yard pass to Richard Smith on the first play. After the game Jones was quoted as saying "I couldn't believe Richard Smith got behind that guy. Our play wasn't designed to go to Richard, but they let him get behind them. If I could have thrown the ball about 10 yards further we would have scored on that play."

After one pass incompletion, Jones threw a 31-yard touchdown pass to DeCori Birmingham, who leaped over LSU defensive back Randall Gay, with nine seconds left on the game clock. Arkansas was penalized 15 yards for excessive celebration, moving the go-ahead extra point to the 18 yard line. Arkansas kicker David Carlton barely made the 35-yard extra point (which was long enough, but curved left) to give Arkansas the 21–20 win and the opportunity to go to the 2002 SEC Championship Game as the SEC Western Division's top seeded co-champion. After the game, Houston Nutt said that when he was sharing the plays to run with Jones, the quarterback, despite completing only two passes up to that point, simply said, "I've got it." LSU had already clinched a share of the SEC Western Division title going into the game but would have advanced to the conference championship game if it had won.  The finish is considered by Arkansas fans as one of the all-time greatest finishes in Razorback history. The Razorbacks, however, were embarrassed in the SEC Championship Game by Georgia, 30–3. The Razorbacks accepted an invitation to the Music City Bowl, where they lost to Minnesota 29–14. The Tigers were invited to the Cotton Bowl, where they lost to Texas 35–20.

2003–2006 
The LSU Tigers won The Boot Trophy four consecutive times between the 2003 and 2006 contests, while also staying at or near the top of the SEC Western Division standings. LSU won the 2003 SEC Championship Game (while going on to win the national championship after winning the 2004 Sugar Bowl), and also went to the 2005 SEC Championship Game. Arkansas went to the 2006 SEC Championship Game despite losing to LSU in The Boot game.

2007 – Houston Nutt's final game 

Arkansas 50 – LSU 48 (3OT)

Coming into the November 23, 2007 game, which was played in Baton Rouge, LSU was ranked #1 in the country in the BCS, and most major polls. The Razorbacks outlasted the Tigers in a grueling three-overtime game for the win.  Star running back (and 2007 Heisman Trophy runner-up) Darren McFadden rushed for 206 yards and three touchdowns, and threw for one touchdown to lift Arkansas to a 50–48 victory in front of 92,606 people (the official attendance) at Tiger Stadium. The "Wild Hog" formation (Arkansas' name for the Wildcat formation) was run prominently in the game, led by McFadden, in which he was a triple threat to run, hand off, or throw.

LSU went on to represent the West in the 2007 SEC Championship Game against the Tennessee Volunteers and, after winning that contest, went on to win the 2008 BCS National Championship Game against the Ohio State Buckeyes—becoming the first ever team to win the BCS National Championship with 2 losses. This game was the last that Houston Nutt coached at Arkansas, resigning a few days later and announcing that he was hired as the new head coach of Ole Miss.

2008 – Miracle on Markham II 

Arkansas 31 – LSU 30

In 2008, Arkansas quarterback Casey Dick threw a 24-yard touchdown pass to wide receiver London Crawford on a fourth-down (with one yard to go) situation with only 22 seconds remaining on the game clock to give the Razorbacks a 31-30 victory over the Tigers at War Memorial Stadium in Little Rock. Coincidentally, Crawford caught it in the same corner in the same endzone DeCori Birmingham had scored the game winner six years earlier. The Razorbacks had trailed, 30–14, early in the third quarter when Casey replaced his younger brother, Nathan, at quarterback.  LSU incurred several penalties that aided Arkansas in the winning drive, which included converting twice on fourth down.

Coming into the game, both teams were unranked and out of contention for the SEC West title. LSU finished the 2008 season ranked third in the West (behind Alabama and Ole Miss) and was bowl-bound. Arkansas finished 4th in the division and was out of contention for a bowl game.

Because of the similarities between this outcome and the 2002 game, some, such as Fayetteville-based The Morning News, called this game the "Miracle on Markham II". Other columnists and news sources, citing less of the impact or flair of the Miracle on Markham, have suggested other titles, such as "Madness on Markham". Quarterback for the Razorbacks at the time, Casey Dick, reluctantly stated, “That’s fine with me,”
when asked about the "Miracle on Markham II" title for the game.

2010 – matchup with Sugar Bowl implications 

In a top-fifteen matchup in War Memorial Stadium, Arkansas regained The Boot trophy with a 31–23 season-defining victory. The Razorbacks’ offense recorded 464 total yards of offense against the Tigers, who had the top-ranked defense in the SEC entering the contest. Arkansas's sophomore running back Knile Davis rushed for 152 yards, including nine straight rushes on the final Arkansas drive, and Ryan Mallett broke the school record of 60 career touchdown passes in the contest. Cobi Hamilton of Arkansas had three catches for 164 yards and two touchdowns of 80 or more yards, including a long score with six seconds remaining before halftime. Stevan Ridley had two rushing scores for LSU. Arkansas ended their season with 10–3 record and LSU ended their season with an 11–2 record.

2011 – top-three matchup 
#3 Arkansas took on #1 LSU on November 25, 2011. Tyler Wilson led the Razorbacks on a touchdown drive, and then Tramain Thomas scored on a fumble return for a TD, and Arkansas led 14–0. LSU promptly scored three more times in the first for a 21–14 lead. In the third, each team kicked a field goal, and it was 24–17 LSU. The Tigers pulled away in the fourth, scoring 17 points for a 41–17 win that sent LSU to the SEC title game instead of Alabama or Arkansas.

2013 – Miracle on Nicholson 
In 2013, LSU had its own equivalent of a "Miracle on Markham" game at home in Tiger Stadium, located along Nicholson Drive. With starting quarterback Zach Mettenberger sidelined by a knee injury in the fourth quarter, an unlikely, last-minute 99.5-yard winning touchdown drive was achieved by a true freshman back-up QB (Anthony Jennings) to hand #15 LSU the victory, 31–27. The win was sealed with a 49-yard TD pass to another freshman, Travin Dural, with just 1:15 remaining.

See also
 List of NCAA college football rivalry games

References

College football rivalries in the United States
Arkansas Razorbacks football
LSU Tigers football